The All Armenian Labour Party, also known as the Pan-Armenian Workers' Party, is a social democratic political party in Armenia.

History
Prior to the 2003 Armenian parliamentary elections, the party announced its support and helped finance the Armenian Revolutionary Federation's campaign. Following the election, the party won two seats in the National Assembly as part of the Armenian Revolutionary Federation's constituency list. 

Prior to the 2007 Armenian parliamentary election, one member of the party became a deputy in the National Assembly under the Republican Party of Armenia's electoral list. The party has not participated in any subsequent Armenian parliamentary elections since 2007.

See also

 Programs of political parties in Armenia
 Politics of Armenia

References

Turner, Barry, ed. The Statesman's Yearbook 2008: The Politics, Cultures and Economies of the World. Springer, 2017.

Labour parties
Political parties in Armenia
Political parties with year of establishment missing
Social democratic parties in Armenia